Acanthurus randalli is a tropical fish found in the western Atlantic ocean. It was first named by Briggs and Caldwell in 1957, and is commonly known as the Gulf surgeonfish.

References

Acanthuridae
Acanthurus
Fish described in 1957